The Sa'ban, Sa'baan or Saban people, are an indigenous Dayak people of Sarawak, Malaysia and East Kalimantan, Indonesia. They are categorised under the Orang Ulu groups in Malaysia and have a close ties with the Kelabit people.

With a population of approximately less than 1,000 people, the Saban considered one of the smallest ethnic groups in Sarawak. Over the last 20 years, most of them had moved to urban areas (mainly Miri) for better living and employment opportunities. The rest still live in their homeland, Long Banga, Long Puak (formerly known as Long Ballong) and Long Peluan.

Being an offshoot of Kelabit tribes, they have similar cultures, traditions and customs. Most Sa'ban people can understand the Kelabit language due to the similarities with their own.

Language
Some simple phrases in Sa'ban:

References

External links

Ethnic groups in Indonesia
Ethnic groups in Sarawak
Dayak people
Headhunting